The Cult of Ray is the third solo studio album by American musician Frank Black. Unlike his previous two albums, which had been produced by former Pere Ubu keyboardist Eric Drew Feldman, Black opted to produce The Cult of Ray himself.

The album title is a reference to author Ray Bradbury. The album's final song is a tribute to Shazeb Andleeb, who was beaten to death at Narbonne High School in Harbor City, California (a school Black attended), in May 1995.

Chart performance
The Cult of Ray peaked at number 1 on the Billboard Heatseekers chart and number 127 on the Billboard 200 in 1996.

Track listing

Personnel
The core musicians employed on this album would eventually be dubbed The Catholics and would continue as Black's backing group for the following seven years (albeit with a changed line up).

Musicians
 Frank Black – vocals, guitar (right channel)
 Scott Boutier – drums
 David McCaffery – bass
 Lyle Workman – lead guitar (left channel)
 Matt Yelton – backing vocals on "Men in Black", "You Ain't Me", "The Adventure and the Resolution" and "Dance War"
 Nick Vincent – drums and bass on "I Don't Want to Hurt You (Every Single Time)"
Technical
 Frank Black – producer 
 Matt Yelton – engineer 
 Billy Bowers – assistant engineer  
 Greg Fidelman – assistant engineer 
 Jim Champagne – assistant engineer
 Eddie Miller – assistant engineer
 Mike Baumgartner – assistant engineer
 Ian MacPherson – assistant engineer
 Andy MacPherson – mixing
 Bob Ludwig – mastering
 Inertia – design

Charts

References

Black Francis albums
1996 albums